Admiral Laxminarayan Ramdas, PVSM, AVSM, VrC, VSM, ADC served as Chief of Naval Staff of the Indian Navy, taking the reins on 30 November 1990. Ramdas has served as Aam Aadmi Party's internal lokpal.

Background and family
Ramdas was born on 5 September 1933 into a south Indian family. He is married to Lalita ramdas  (née Katari), daughter of Admiral Ram Dass Katari, the first Indian Chief of Naval Staff. He is a member of the Aam Aadmi party. His younger daughter, Kavita Ramdas, is the senior advisor to the President of the Ford Foundation and had previously served for many years as country representative of the Ford Foundation in India. Kavita Ramdas is married to Zulfiqar Ahmad, a Pakistani national who is a peace activist.

Career
Ramdas was commissioned into the Indian Navy on 1 September 1953, with seniority as a sub-lieutenant from the same date. He was promoted to lieutenant on 16 August 1955, and to lieutenant-commander on 16 August 1963. He was trained as a communication specialist in the Royal Naval Staff College in the United Kingdom. Promoted Commander on 30 June 1969, he went on to establish and head the Naval Academy in Kochi, Kerala, he distinguished himself for which he was awarded Vishisht Seva Medal.

Indo-Pakistani War of 1971
During the Indo-Pakistani War of 1971, as part of the newly-formed Eastern Fleet, whilst in command of INS Beas, Admiral Ramdas took part in the most effective naval blockade of East Pakistan which frustrated Pakistan's attempt to evacuate 93,000 of their troops who eventually surrendered to the Indian Forces. INS Beas also captured a large number of ships carrying contraband to East Pakistan, bombarded Cox's Bazar and took part in the landing and other operations in an area which had been mined. He was awarded the Vir Chakra, the third-highest gallantry award.

The citation for the Vir Chakra reads as follows:

Post-war
After the war, Ramdas commanded a Patrol Vessel Squadron in the Indian Navy. He later served as Naval Attaché in Germany for three years, and was promoted captain on 1 July 1976. He also held the appointments of Director of Personnel, Director of Naval Signals and Director of Naval Operations at Naval HQ.

Flag rank
Ramdas was promoted acting Rear Admiral 7 April 1981 (substantive from 1 June 1981) and took over as Assistant Chief of Naval Staff (Operations) at NHQ. On 29 June 1983, he was appointed Flag Officer Commanding Eastern Fleet (FOCEF). He took command of the Eastern Fleet from Rear Admiral IJS Khurana. 

Ramdas was promoted Vice Admiral on 1 April 1985 and appointed Controller of Warship Production & Acquisition (CWP&A). On 20 February 1986, he took over as Deputy Chief of Naval Staff (DNCS). After an eighteen month stint as DCNS, Ramdas was appointed Flag Officer Commanding-in-Chief Southern Naval Command. He took command from Vice Admiral Gulab Mohanlal Hiranandani at Kochi. In February 1989, he moved to Vizag as the Flag Officer Commanding-in-Chief Eastern Naval Command. On 26 January 1989, he was awarded the Param Vishisht Seva Medal. He was at the helm of the Eastern Naval Command for about twenty months.

Chief of Naval Staff
Ramdas was appointed the next Chief of the Naval Staff, succeeding Admiral Jayant Ganpat Nadkarni. He took over as CNS on 30 November 1990. On 30 June 1993, with General Sunith Francis Rodrigues supperannuating, he took over as Chairman of the Chiefs of Staff Committee.

Retirement
After retirement, Ramdas took up residence at Alibag. He together with his wife, then devoted themselves to a variety of left-liberal causes. 

The couple also intervene in military matters. They were part of the group which filed a PIL in the Supreme Court of India against the appointment of the then Lt. Gen. Bikram Singh for the post of Chief of Army Staff. 

The couple opposed the establishment of the Kudankulam Nuclear Power Plant in Tamil Nadu. For his efforts to demilitarise and denuclearize South Asia, and his efforts to prevent the building of the Kudankulam reactor, Ramdas was awarded the Ramon Magsaysay Award for peace in 2004.

Ramdas is also a keen sports person, enjoying cricket, golf and yachting.

References

Chiefs of the Naval Staff (India)
Indian Navy admirals
Deputy Chiefs of Naval Staff (India)
Flag Officers Commanding Eastern Fleet
Ramon Magsaysay Award winners
Living people
Recipients of the Vir Chakra
Recipients of the Param Vishisht Seva Medal
Indian anti–nuclear weapons activists
People from Alibag
Aam Aadmi Party politicians
1933 births
National Defence College, India alumni
Recipients of the Ati Vishisht Seva Medal
Recipients of the Vishisht Seva Medal
Indian naval attachés